This is a list of Olympic records in shooting, current after the 2020 Summer Olympics.


Men's records

Women's records

Notes 
  Old ISSF rule.
  New ISSF rule.

References

External links

 
 

Shooting
Records
Shooting records
Sport shooting-related lists